Harun Ülman (11 July 1900 – 26 January 1977) was a Turkish sailor. He competed in the Star event at the 1936 Summer Olympics.

References

External links
 

1900 births
1977 deaths
Turkish male sailors (sport)
Olympic sailors of Turkey
Sailors at the 1936 Summer Olympics – Star
Place of birth missing